Arslanagić Bridge, also known as Perović Bridge, is a bridge in the municipality of Trebinje, Bosnia and Herzegovina, and since 25 January 2006 a National Monument of Bosnia and Herzegovina.

See also 
List of bridges in Bosnia and Herzegovina
List of National Monuments of Bosnia and Herzegovina

References

Ottoman bridges in Bosnia and Herzegovina
National Monuments of Bosnia and Herzegovina
Demolished bridges
Rebuilt buildings and structures in Bosnia and Herzegovina
Bridges completed in 1966
Stone arch bridges in Bosnia and Herzegovina

Buildings and structures in Trebinje